Playahead was a large Internet community mainly aimed at Swedish teenagers. The site was founded 1998 and became one of the largest Internet communities in Sweden. At its height of popularity, Playahead was, together with LunarStorm and Hamsterpaj, the most popular social networks amongst Swedish teenagers.

About
Playahead was a site much alike LunarStorm. It was a place for teenagers to meet, talk, write to each other, look at each other's pictures and debate in forums. Members could also pay a small fee of "Playahead-Dollars" to create a team, based on their interest, and then other members could join the team. Most of the members were between 13 and 24 years old.

History
The site was founded by Jonas Frost, Magnus Hansson and Henrik Weimenhög, and was from the beginning named "Hångelguiden" (translates to The Make Out Guide). In 2000, the site was sold to a company based in Helsingborg, named Playahead. It claimed to have 2.9 million members, making an average of around 5,9 million logins per month. After 2007 the site had not done so well and had only 600,000 visitors a week. It was sold once again to the company Modern Times Group. As of May 2009 the site had an Alexa rank of around 29,000. The Site closed March 1, 2010.

See also
Bilddagboken
LunarStorm

References

External links
Playahead Community
Playahead Community Denmark

Swedish social networking websites
Internet properties established in 2000
Internet properties disestablished in 2010